Rambuasalama augustasi is a moth in the  family Cossidae, and the only species in the genus Rambuasalama. It is found in Madagascar.

References

Natural History Museum Lepidoptera generic names catalog

Cossinae